Yacotzin (fl. ca. early 16th century) was the wife of Nezahualpilli, king of Texcoco and mother of Ixtlilxochitl II. Upon finding out she had been unfaithful to him, Nezahualpilli had her publicly executed.

References

Aztec people
16th-century Mexican people
16th-century indigenous people of the Americas
Indigenous Mexican women